"Lie Down in Darkness" is a song by American electronica musician Moby. It was released as the third single from his tenth studio album Destroyed on August 1, 2011.

Background
The song features vocals from Joy Malcolm, who later joined him on his 2011 Destroyed Tour in support for the album.

Release
On June 24, 2011, Moby announced that a new single would be released from Destroyed, and invited users to suggest a song to release as a single through the website. On June 27, it was announced that the next single would be "Lie Down in Darkness".

A sample of "Lie Down in Darkness" was used in the 2012 Hugo Boss advert for Nuit Pour Femme, featuring Gwyneth Paltrow.

Music video
On August 15, the song's video was released exclusively via Wired. It was filmed by UK filmmakers Institute for Eyes, who also directed the documentary Isolation, among others. The video follows an astronaut looking back on his life of space travel, journeying through an architecturally heightened London.

Luke Seomore and Joseph Bull, aka Institute for Eyes, said about the idea for the video: “The song has a graceful, very cinematic quality, so the idea of weightlessness quickly began to form. An intense otherworldly journey seemed to mirror the atmosphere of the song. Somesuch and Co helped us to put together a great team to make the video happen; we hope you enjoy it.” Moby said about the video: "It was great working with video directors Institute for Eyes, and I'm really happy with the final result. Their video really enhances the cinematic qualities in the song."

Track listing

 Digital download
"Lie Down in Darkness"  – 3:20
"Lie Down in Darkness"  – 9:09
"Lie Down in Darkness"  – 5:35
"Lie Down in Darkness"  – 6:01
"Lie Down in Darkness"  – 7:18
"Lie Down in Darkness"  – 5:16

 Digital download – remixes 
"Lie Down in Darkness"  – 3:52
"Lie Down in Darkness"  – 7:18
"Lie Down in Darkness"  – 6:02
"Lie Down in Darkness"  – 6:01
"Lie Down in Darkness"  – 5:37
"Lie Down in Darkness"  – 9:32
"Lie Down in Darkness"  – 5:45
"Lie Down in Darkness"  – 5:03
"Lie Down in Darkness"  – 7:37
"Lie Down in Darkness"  – 5:35
"Lie Down in Darkness"  – 6:09
"Lie Down in Darkness"  – 9:09

Charts

Release history

References

External links
 

Moby songs
2011 singles
Mute Records singles
Songs written by Moby